M.I.U. Album is the 22nd studio album by American rock band the Beach Boys, released on September 25, 1978. Characterized for its easy-listening sound, the album was produced by Al Jardine and touring member Ron Altbach during one of the most acrimonious periods in the band's history. It sold poorly, peaking at number 151 in the U.S, and was met with confused reactions from critics and fans.

The album was created to fulfill contractual obligations to Reprise Records after the group had shelved Adult/Child. It was largely recorded in late 1977 at its namesake: Maharishi International University in Fairfield, Iowa. Only Jardine, Mike Love, and Brian Wilson appear consistently throughout the album, with Carl and Dennis Wilson's contributions confined to a pair of tracks. Brian was credited as "executive producer". It includes the songs "Hey Little Tomboy", the only track salvaged from Adult/Child, and "My Diane", written about Brian's affair with his sister-in-law, as well as cover versions of the 1950s hits "Peggy Sue" and "Come Go with Me".

M.I.U. continues to be widely regarded as one of the worst Beach Boys albums. In 1981, "Come Go with Me" reached number 18 when it was issued as a single from the compilation Ten Years of Harmony. In 1998, several songs that were intended for the unreleased album Merry Christmas from the Beach Boys, which was produced during the M.I.U. sessions, were released on the compilation Ultimate Christmas.

Background

At the beginning of 1977, the Beach Boys had enjoyed their most lucrative concert tours ever, with the band playing in packed stadiums and earning up to $150,000 per show. Early that year, Brian Wilson produced Adult/Child, which would have been their final record on Reprise, a subsidiary of Warner Bros. It  was largely recorded by Brian with Dennis and Carl while Al Jardine and Mike Love were preoccupied elsewhere. In Love's case, he had been ensconced at a six-month Transcendental Meditation retreat, called "the TM-Sidhi program", in Vittel, France and Leysin, Switzerland, where he studied levitation under Maharishi Mahesh Yogi.

Concurrently, the band were the subject of a record company bidding war, as their contract with Warner had been set to expire soon. Band manager and business advisor Stephen Love arranged for the Beach Boys to sign an $8 million deal with CBS Records on March 1. Biographer Steven Gaines writes that Warner "knew of the CBS deal" and were "so disgusted with the band at this point" that the label refused to promote the group's forthcoming album, The Beach Boys Love You. Within weeks of the CBS contract, Stephen was effectively fired by the band, with one of the alleged reasons being that Mike had not permitted Stephen to sign on his behalf while in Switzerland. Mike and Jardine also vetoed the release of Adult/Child due to its bizarre content and the commercial failure of Love You, issued in April.

Stephen's replacement was entertainment business owner Henry Lazarus, who arranged a major European tour for the Beach Boys starting in June. The tour was cancelled prematurely, as Lazarus had failed to complete the necessary paperwork. This resulted in the group being sued by many of the concert promoters, with losses of $200,000 in preliminary expenses and $550,000 in potential revenue. In August, Mike and Jardine persuaded Stephen to return as the group's manager, a decision that Carl and Dennis had strongly opposed. On September 1, the internal wrangling came to a head after a show at Central Park, when the band effectively split into two camps: Dennis and Carl on one side, Mike and Jardine on the other, with Brian remaining neutral.  By then, the two opposing contingents within the group – known among their associates as the "free-livers" and the "meditators" – were traveling in different planes, using different hotels, and rarely speaking to each other.

On September 2, Mike, Jardine, and Brian met with Stephen at their hotel in New York and signed the documents necessary to officially appoint him as the Beach Boys' manager. The next day, after completing the final date of a northeastern tour, a confrontation between the "free-livers" and the "meditators" broke out on an airport tarmac during a stopover in Newark. Dennis subsequently declared to a bystanding Rolling Stone journalist that he had left the band. In a follow-up interview, Love denied that the group had broken up, but Dennis maintained, "I can assure you that the group broke up and you witnessed it." However, the group were still legally obligated to deliver one more album to Warner. Two weeks later, on September 17, the band members, their lawyers, and their wives reconvened at Brian's house, where they negotiated a settlement resulting in Mike gaining control of Brian's vote in the group, allowing Mike and Jardine to outvote Carl and Dennis on any matter.

Style and production

Iowa sessions

To satisfy the terms of their contracts with Warner and CBS, the Beach Boys intended to record two albums – one for Warner and the other for CBS – at Maharishi International University in Fairfield, Iowa. Mike chose this venue to keep members of the band away from their drug suppliers in Los Angeles. At MIU, the group and their family members took residence in the university's circular dorm rooms, and attended meditation classes and meetings. The recording sessions lasted from November 7 to December 4, 1977. AFM documentation indicates that Carl visited on two days, while Dennis, who was busy promoting his solo album Pacific Ocean Blue, played drums on an early session for "She's Got Rhythm".

The album was produced by Al Jardine and, from the group's touring band, keyboardist Ron Altbach. Gaines writes that the atmosphere was similar to when the group recorded their 1973 album Holland, "only worse." According to Love, Carl and Dennis "took the whole experience [...] as a personal affront, and they came and went with little interest in the music. Brian was with us but miserable throughout." Brian's bodyguard Stan Love described the overall proceedings as "torture. Agony. Like being put right in the middle of nowhere, frozen and cold and small, with only one decent restaurant in town. Brian was putting in his time, but he wasn't too happy. He was depressed and on medication. We passed the time playing Ping-Pong." Stan added that Wilson did not want to produce his bandmates because he resented them personally. In particular, "Brian didn't want to write with [Mike] anymore, but of course Mike tried to hang on, doing his arrogant pressure trip on him."

In a 1995 interview, Brian stated that he could not remember making the album, claiming that he had gone through a "mental blank-out" during this period. He was credited as the album's "executive producer", but according to biographer Peter Ames Carlin, the credit was likely for contractual reasons. Carlin characterizes the record as having "a generic easy-listening sound, heavy on the tinkly keyboards and sweeping strings, with nary a trace of Brian's ear for quirky texture." It included the Love You outtake "My Diane", sung by Dennis, and written by Brian as an expression of anguish following the end of his affair with his sister-in-law, Diane Rovell.

Discarded tracks and further recording
Merry Christmas from the Beach Boys was the other album that the band produced at these sessions, consisting of reworkings of tracks that had dated from the early to mid-1970s, as well as alternate Christmas-themed versions of songs from M.I.U.. Biographer Timothy White reported that Winds of Change and California Feeling were both working titles for M.I.U.. According to music historian Andrew Doe, 

On December 13, 1977, the band held a session – for the vocal to "My Diane" and a Toys for Tots PSA – at Kaye-Smiths Studios in Seattle that was filmed for the television special Our Team. Intermittent sessions for M.I.U. – specifically, for the tracks "My Diane", "Belles of Paris", and "Winds of Change" – continued at Brother Studios and Wally Heider Recording from February 22 to June 28, 1978. The outtakes "Our Team" and "Egypt" (also known as "Why?") were released on the box sets Good Vibrations (1993) and Made in California, respectively. Still-unreleased tracks include "Beach Burlesque", "Go and Get That Girl", "How's About a Little Bit of Your Sweet Lovin'?", "Mike, Come Back to L.A", "Basketball Rock", "Bowling", "I Really Love You",  "It Could Be Anything", "Rubles", "Ride Arabian, Ride", "TM Siddhi Program", a demo of "Almost Summer", and other tracks related to the Merry Christmas album.

Release 

Music journalist Richard Williams reported, "Love and Jardine tried to offer M.I.U. Album to Epic, as the first delivery under their new deal. That they were turned down, on grounds of quality, is a tribute to Epic's discretion."

Lead single "Peggy Sue" was issued in the U.S. in August and peaked at number 59. M.I.U. was released in September and reached number 151 in the U.S, becoming their first album to miss the UK chart completely since The Beach Boys' Christmas Album (1964). The Jardine-led cover of the Del-Vikings' "Come Go with Me" became a U.S. No. 18 hit in late 1981, when it was released as a single from the Ten Years of Harmony compilation.

Critical reception

M.I.U Album was met with confusion from critics and fans, and continues to be widely regarded as one of the Beach Boys' worst albums. According to music critic Nick Kent, the album was so "dreadful" that its "pitiful content" was ignored by critics. Upon release, Rolling Stones Tom Carson stated, 

Richard Williams, who had championed the Beach Boys' work in the 1960s, wrote a similarly negative review which stated, in part,

In his 2006 biography of Wilson, Carlin referred to it as "the most cynical, spiritually void work the group ever produced", a "gruesome album", and perhaps "one of the worst records ever made by a great rock band."  AllMusic's John Bush stated, "The mainstream late-'70s production techniques are predictable and frequently cloying. M.I.U. Album also included several of the worst Beach Boys songs ever to make it to vinyl. [...] Compared with what had come before, M.I.U. Album was a pathetic attempt at music making; compared with what was to come however, this was a highlight."

Conversely, Jeff Tamarkin, who wrote liner notes for the album's CD reissue, decreed that the album "stands on  own as a lovely, unique work." In 1981, Robert Christgau called the album "dumb [...] despite a lot of fairly pleasant music and a few passable songs". Reviewing the album's 2002 reissue, The A.V. Clubs Keith Phipps stated, "M.I.U. is competent enough, but it's also the sound of a group buying into its own mythology, a retrograde salute to the pinstripes and sunshine image it had abandoned years before."

Legacy
Reflecting on M.I.U. Album in a 1992 interview, Mike Love opined that "there's some neat gems there but there wasn't a coherence." Asked about the album in a 1979 interview, Dennis Wilson said, "I hope that karma will fuck up Mike Love's meditation forever. That album is an embarrassment to my life. It should self-destruct."

Track listing
Track details per 2000 CD liner notes.

Personnel
Per 2000 CD liner notes.

The Beach Boys
Al Jardine – vocals, guitar, bass guitar, vocal arrangements
Mike Love – vocals
Brian Wilson – vocals, piano, electric piano, vocal and horn arrangements
Carl Wilson – vocals, guitar 
Dennis Wilson – vocals, drums

Touring musicians

Michael Andreas – saxophone, horn arrangements
Ron Altbach – piano, electric piano, organ, percussion, synthesizer, horns
Lance Buller – trumpet
Gary Griffin – piano, electric piano, organ, synthesizer, string arrangements
Ed Carter – guitar, bass guitar
John Foss – trumpet
Billy Hinsche – guitar
Mike Kowalski – drums, percussion
Charles Lloyd – saxophone
Rod Novak – saxophone

Additional players
Chris Midaugh – steel pedal guitar
Charlie McCarthy – saxophone
Bob Williams – saxophone
Roberleigh Barnhardt – string arrangements

Recording engineering personnel & assistants

Al Jardine – producer
Ron Altbach – producer
Brian Wilson – executive producer
Diane Rovell – music coordinator
John Hanlon – recording engineer
Earle Mankey – recording engineer
Stephen Moffitt – recording engineer
Jeff Peters – recording engineer, final mixdown producer
Bob Rose – recording engineer

Artwork
Dean O. Torrence – album design, graphics
The Beach Boys – album design, graphics
Warren Bolster/Surfer Magazine – front cover photography
Guy Webster – back cover photography

Charts

Notes

References

Bibliography

External links
 
 
 

The Beach Boys albums
Capitol Records albums
Reprise Records albums
1978 albums
Brother Records albums
Albums produced by Al Jardine
Albums recorded at Wally Heider Studios
Albums with cover art by Dean Torrence